America West Airlines was a major American airline, founded in 1981, with service commencing in 1983, and having reached US$1 billion in annual revenue in 1989, headquartered in Tempe, Arizona. At the time of its acquisition of US Airways, America West had the unique distinction of being the only post-deregulation U.S. airline still operating under its original operating certificate. Their main hub was at Phoenix Sky Harbor International Airport, with a secondary hub at Harry Reid International Airport in Las Vegas. The airline acquired US Airways in 2005 but took on the name of US Airways. America West served about 100 cities in the US, Canada, and Mexico; flights to Europe were on codeshare partners. In September 2005, the airline had 140 aircraft, with a single maintenance base at Phoenix Sky Harbor Airport. Regional jet and turboprop flights were operated on a code sharing basis by Mesa Airlines and Chautauqua Airlines as America West Express.

Beginning in January 2006, all America West flights were branded as US Airways, along with most signage at airports and other printed material, though many flights were described as "operated by America West." Apart from two heritage aircraft, the only remaining America West branding on aircraft were found on some seat covers and bulkheads. The merged airline used America West's "CACTUS" callsign and ICAO code "AWE", but retained the US Airways name. As part of a merger between American Airlines and US Airways in February 2013, which led to American becoming the world's largest airline, the call sign and ICAO code name was later retired on April 8, 2015, when the FAA granted a single operating certificate for both US Airways and American Airlines. The US Airways brand continued until October 17, 2015, when it merged with American Airlines.

History

The airline was established in February 1981 and began operations August 1, 1983, using three leased Boeing 737s flying out of its base in Phoenix, Arizona (PHX), with Ed Beauvais, a well-known airline industry consultant, as CEO. In the early years, passengers could purchase their tickets on the aircraft.

The airline quickly expanded, with 11 737s flying to 13 cities; in 1984, America West's fleet grew to 21 aircraft flying to 23 cities. The June 1984 timetable shows 71 weekday departures from Phoenix, non-stop to 18 cities; from 1985 to 1986, it built-up a second hub at Las Vegas.

Confident in its expansion, the increasingly dominant carrier at Phoenix Sky Harbor influenced the development of Terminal 4. America West requested that the construction include an auxiliary power facility and an underground cavity to accommodate a future rail station, to which the airport ultimately agreed.

America West was one of the first airlines to use extensive "cross-utilization", in which employees were trained in a variety of airline jobs, such as pilots trained in dispatch, and both baggage handlers and flight attendants trained as gate agents. America West started as a "full-service" airline, in contrast with Southwest Airlines, the discount air carrier competing in many markets. America West used an aggressive employee stock ownership program, in which new employees were required to invest 20% of their salary in company stock, providing a steady flow of cash as the company grew.  America West pilots and other employees were paid wages far below those of competitors

By 1985 America West had outgrown their gate space at Phoenix Sky Harbor International Airport, and during the construction of Terminal 4, approved in 1986, a temporary concourse was added to the southwest corner of Terminal 3 to give them six more gates (growing to eleven by 1990).

The airline's growth continued in 1986, and the airline expanded its fleet, mainly with Boeing 757-200s purchased from Northwest Airlines (following Northwest's acquisition of Republic Airlines) and a number of de Havilland Canada DHC-8 Dash 8s. (Unusually, the Dash 8 flights were not code-shares, and Mesa code-shares replaced them in 1992–93.) The airline started red-eye flights from Las Vegas to improve aircraft utilization.

America West's rapid growth led to large losses, and by 1986 the company was on the verge of bankruptcy. Originally slated to occupy the vast majority of the gates in Terminal 4, the airline had to reduce their commitment to the city of Phoenix to just 28 gates, with the growing Southwest Airlines agreeing to lease the remainder of Terminal 4.

In June 1987 Ansett Transport Industries purchased a 20% stake in America West, increasing it to 26% in April 1991.

In 1988 Patrick Thurston, Vice-President of Operations, Bob Russell, Chief of Pilots, and Carl Wobser, a captain, all pleaded guilty to multiple counts of narcotics trafficking.

Three America West Airlines aircraft operated services in Australia with Ansett Australia during the 1989 Australian pilots' dispute.

As they explored destinations beyond the United States, America West filed with Department of Transportation for a Phoenix to Sydney route to connect with Ansett Airlines in Australia. The proposal was rejected, and the Reagan Administration awarded the route to another airline. In 1989 America West leased four Boeing 747-200s (formerly operated by KLM) and began non-stop 747 flights between Phoenix and Honolulu, Hawaii and non-stop between Honolulu and Nagoya, Japan. The 747 was the only wide body aircraft operated by America West. The airline also expanded narrow body jet service to Mexican destinations.

In 1990 America West moved into the new Terminal 4 at Phoenix and took delivery of several Airbus A320s originally destined for now-defunct Braniff Airways. Braniff had purchased the order rights from Pan Am, another troubled carrier, and the A320s were sold to America West at a steep discount. Annual revenue reached a billion dollars, the threshold for the Department of Transportation to categorize America West as a major airline. The July 1990 timetable shows 182 weekday departures from Phoenix non-stop to 46 airports, and 132 departures from Las Vegas to 39 airports. (24 LAS departures were between midnight and 01:40)

The airline continued to lose money. Operating expenses at Terminal 4 were far higher than in the temporary Terminal 3 concourse; the Nagoya route carried almost no passengers; tensions before the Gulf War caused fuel costs to rise. America West filed for bankruptcy in June 1991.

In June 1995, W. Douglas Parker joined America West as senior vice president and chief financial officer; he would be elected chairman, president and CEO in September 2001.  The airline was fined $2.5 million for maintenance violations in July 1998, and in August 2000 the FAA was reportedly prepared to ground the airline for these violations.

Bankruptcy

America West operated under bankruptcy from 1991 to 1994. As part of the restructuring, employee stock became worthless, the airline's 747s and Dash 8s were sold, and the fleet was pared down to 87 aircraft. Hawaii and Nagoya routes were scrapped and America West feeder service to smaller cities and local markets was contracted to Mesa Airlines, which began flying turboprops and regional jets as America West Express.

On the management side, Founder Ed Beauvais was removed as CEO, remaining on the board of directors, and was replaced with Mike Conway, who had been with the airline since the start. Conway left the airline in 1994, replaced as CEO by A. Maurice Myers.

America West's flight attendants unionized in 1993, ending cross-utilization between customer service agents, flight attendants, and ground agents. Several maintenance and training functions previously operated in-house by America West were outsourced during the bankruptcy.

Reorganization

In 1994, America West was finally able to secure a reorganization allowing it to come out of bankruptcy, with a large portion of the airline owned by a partnership including Mesa Airlines and Continental Airlines, resulting in code sharing agreements with these airlines.

To help reinvigorate the airline as they emerged from bankruptcy, a number of changes occurred, including a new color scheme and logo (used until the merger with US Airways), new livery, E-tickets, and online ticket purchasing in 1996. The airline continued ordering Airbus A320s and began gradually retiring their older Boeing 737-200s.

In the 1990s America West opened a hub at Port Columbus International Airport in Columbus, Ohio, using Chautauqua Airlines and Mesa Airlines to provide commuter and regional flights via code sharing agreements in addition to mainline jets.   An America West Club was at the hub in an area previously used for a TWA Ambassadors' Club.

In late 2001 America West was the first airline to apply for and receive a loan from the Air Transportation Stabilization Board. As of April 2005, the remaining balance on the loan was $300 million. The ATSB loan and its guarantees were paid back by US Airways and the debt refinanced by other lenders during the merger.

In 2003 America West Airlines closed its Port Columbus hub, reducing scheduled daily flights from almost 50 to 4.

US Airways

In the second quarter of 2005 America West entered merger negotiations with then-bankrupt US Airways. It was structured as a purchase of US Airways by America West Holdings; however, the internal structure was a reverse merger, with legacy US Airways operations taken over by those of America West.

As the holding companies merged, brand conversion began. The America West Club was renamed the US Airways Club in October 2005. All new America West aircraft were delivered in the new US Airways livery, and older aircraft repainted (while retaining America West interiors). Gates and ticket counters were consolidated at airports where both airlines had operated, aided by the March 2007 transfer of all US Airways reservations to the Shares computer system used by America West (US Airways had previously used a very different  Sabre system).

All express flights were branded as US Airways Express, and aircraft were no longer confined to operations out of their pre-merger hubs (America West aircraft could fly from Philadelphia to cities other than Phoenix and Las Vegas, for example). The two airlines' operating certificates were merged on September 25, 2007. After initially using the "CACTUS" callsign for the west fleet and "USAIR" for the east fleet, all aircraft began flying under a single "CACTUS" callsign and ICAO code "AWE" in September 2008. Former America West aircraft were distinguished apart from US Airways pre-merger aircraft by their use of registrations ending in "-AW", while pre-merger US Airways aircraft used registrations ending in "-US". US Airways would later merge with American Airlines in 2013, with the former America West callsign and ICAO code retired in 2015 (alongside with the US Airways brand). America West's Phoenix hub has remained intact with American Airlines.

Destinations

Fleet

Final fleet

As of September 27, 2005, at the time of the merger, America West Airlines' fleet consisted of the following aircraft:

Retired fleet
America West Airlines previously operated the following aircraft:

America West Express aircraft

America West Express services primarily operated by Mesa Airlines via a code sharing agreement with America West utilized the following regional jet and turboprop aircraft.

Cancelled/Planned Orders
In 1991, America West had plans for purchasing 4 Boeing 747-400 aircraft to replace the aging 747-200s in Honolulu service, but an order of 10 further Boeing 757-200s was also mentioned.

Furthermore, it was in the plans to purchase 15 Airbus A318s in the late 1990s aside with their new orders of A320s at the time but this never came to fruition.

America West had also planned on announcing an order of 60 aircraft on September 12 of 2001, but this was quickly retracted after the September 11th attacks.

FlightFund
The airline had a frequent flyer program called FlightFund. In 2006, FlightFund was merged into the US Airways Dividend Miles program.

Partner airlines or programs for Dividend Miles (formerly FlightFund) include:

America West Express
Hawaiian Airlines - Limited
Royal Jordanian Airlines
US Airways
Virgin Atlantic
United Airlines

Codeshare agreements
America West had codeshare agreements with the following airlines:

Mesa Airlines operating as America West Express (regional jet and turboprop feeder service at America West hubs)
Big Sky Airlines
EVA Air
Royal Jordanian Airlines
US Airways
Virgin Atlantic
British Airways
Chautauqua Airlines operating as America West Express (regional jet feeder service at the former Columbus hub)
Continental Airlines
Hawaiian Airlines
Northwest Airlines
Qantas (ended February 28, 2007)
Trans World Airlines (TWA)

Headquarters

America West had its headquarters in Tempe, Arizona from the airline's start in 1983, and it retained the same location when it merged with US Airways and retained the US Airways name. The airline used the nine-story  building as its headquarters once America West and US Airways merged, but the building has since been vacated when US Airways' management team took over American Airlines in an acquisition. Jahna Berry of the Arizona Business Gazette said in 2005 that the building "is one of the dominant buildings in downtown Tempe." The City of Tempe gave America West $11 million in incentives and tax breaks so it could occupy the headquarters, which cost $37 million to construct. The construction of the building began in January 1998; the groundbreaking ceremony was held on February 19 of that year. The previous America West headquarters were demolished.

Other commercial interests
America West had promotional partnerships with the Phoenix Suns NBA team, the 2001 World Series champion Arizona Diamondbacks baseball team, and the Arizona Cardinals NFL team.

In 1992, America West paid $26 million for the 30-year naming rights of the Phoenix Suns' home court, which it named America West Arena. Since the merger with US Airways, the arena was called US Airways Center (not to be confused with the USAir Arena in Prince George's County, Maryland, razed in 2002), until it was renamed to Talking Stick Resort arena.

Accidents and incidents
America West had four in-flight incidents on its aircraft, but never had an accident resulting in a fatality. Two accidents resulted in hull loss write-offs.

See also
 List of defunct airlines of the United States

References

External links

 

 
Airlines established in 1981
Airlines disestablished in 2007
Companies based in Tempe, Arizona
Defunct airlines of the United States
Defunct companies based in Arizona
Defunct low-cost airlines
Ansett Australia
History of Phoenix, Arizona
Companies that filed for Chapter 11 bankruptcy in 1991
Airlines based in Arizona